Kuchinotsu may refer to:
Kuchinotsu, Nagasaki, a former town in Nagasaki, Japan
Kuchinotsu No. 37, a citrus cultivar and one parent of the setoka